Artyom Sedunov (born January 18, 1988) is a Russian professional ice hockey defenceman. He is currently playing with Molot-Prikamie Perm of the Supreme Hockey League (VHL).

Sedunov made his Kontinental Hockey League debut playing with Amur Khabarovsk during the 2013–14 season.

References

External links

1988 births
Living people
Amur Khabarovsk players
Kazakhmys Satpaev players
HC Khimik Voskresensk players
HC Kuban players
HC Lada Togliatti players
Russian ice hockey defencemen
HC Ryazan players
HC Sochi players